Luxor is a game and series of tile-matching action puzzle video games, developed and published by MumboJumbo, with the initial release in 2005. The first sequel to this game was Luxor: Amun Rising, which was released in 2005 followed by Luxor 2, which was released in 2006 and included new gameplay, levels and bonus. After that came Luxor 3, which featured seven gameplay modes and improved graphics. It was followed by Luxor: Quest for the Afterlife.

Gameplay 

Luxor’s gameplay is similar to Puzz Loop and Zuma. The user eliminates colored magical spheres by causing three or more spheres of the same color to collide. When spheres are eliminated, nearby spheres which now form a segment of three or more of the same color will also explode in a chain reaction.

During gameplay, the on-screen spheres continuously move forward, pushed themselves by additional small scarabs. If any sphere reaches the player's pyramid, the player loses a life and is forced to restart the level. If the player succeeds in eliminating a certain number of spheres without this occurring, new spheres cease to arrive and the level can be completed by removing those which remain.

Power-ups like Fireball are given if the player manages to make three consecutive matches.

Games

Complaint
After competitor Codeminion released their game StoneLoops! of Jurassica for iPhone, MumboJumbo sent a complaint to Apple with the request to remove the game from the Apple App Store. According to MumboJumbo the game has many similarities with the Luxor-series which could confuse customers. Apple accepted the complaint and the game was removed.

External links
 Luxor Game Facebook Page

References 

2005 video games
IOS games
Nintendo 3DS eShop games
MacOS games
PlayStation Portable games
Puzzle video games
Video games developed in the United States
Video games set in Egypt
Windows games
Video game clones
Casual games
MumboJumbo games
J2ME games